The Western North Carolina Athletic Conference (WNCAC), is a North Carolina High School Athletic Association conference which has operated in the western region of North Carolina since August 2009.  Prior to January 2011, it was referred to as the Appalachian Athletic Conference. However, a name change was forced when the NCHSAA was hit by a copyright claim from the National Association of Intercollegiate Athletics (NAIA) which operates a collegiate conference using the same name .  The conference currently consists of five 3A schools and three 2A schools. In terms of playoffs, these schools compete in their respective NCHSAA classifications. The current lineup will run through at least June 2017.

Member schools

References

Tuscola-Pisgah Rivalry
North Carolina high school sports conferences